Face of Fire is a 1959 American drama film directed by Albert Band and written by Louis A. Garfinkle. It is based on the 1898 short story The Monster by Stephen Crane. The film stars Cameron Mitchell, James Whitmore, Bettye Ackerman, Miko Oscard, Royal Dano, Robert F. Simon, Richard Erdman and Howard Smith. The film was released on August 9, 1959, by Allied Artists Pictures.

Plot

Cast          
Cameron Mitchell as Ned Trescott
James Whitmore as Monk Johnson
Bettye Ackerman as Grace Trescott
Miko Oscard as Jimmie Trescott
Royal Dano as Jake Winter
Robert F. Simon as Judge Hagenthorpe
Richard Erdman as Al Williams
Howard Smith as Sheriff Nolan 
Lois Maxwell as Ethel Winter
Jill Donohue as Bella Kovac
Harold Kasket as Reifsnyder
Aletha Orr as Martha
Charles Fawcett as Citizen in Barbershop
Vernon Young
Robert Trebor as Dr. John
Doreen Denning as Kate
Lorena Holmin as Carrie
Hjördis Petterson as Mrs. Kovac

References

External links
 

1959 films
English-language Swedish films
American drama films
Swedish drama films
1959 drama films
Allied Artists films
Films directed by Albert Band
American black-and-white films
1950s English-language films
1950s American films
1950s Swedish films
English-language drama films